KDSD may refer to:

 KDSD-FM, a radio station (90.9 FM) licensed to Pierpont, South Dakota, United States
 KDSD-TV, a television station (channel 17) licensed to Aberdeen, South Dakota, United States